Kosalar is a village and municipality in the Qazakh Rayon of Azerbaijan.  It has a population of 3,869.

References 

Populated places in Qazax District